Walter Little may refer to:

 Walter Little (politician) (1877–1961), Canadian politician
 Walter Little (rugby union) (born 1969), former New Zealand rugby player
 Walter J. Little, served in the California legislature
 Wally Little (1897–1976), English footballer